Patricia Kara Cameron (September 20, 1948 – October 15, 2021), sometimes credited as JoAnna Cameron, was an American actress and model, perhaps best known for her portrayal of the title role on Isis, a 1970s children's television series, which was later rebroadcast as The Secrets of Isis.

Career

Early career
While at college, Cameron became friends with Linda Hope, the daughter of Bob Hope. When she was introduced to the famous comedian, he cast her in the film How to Commit Marriage in 1969. This led to a series of film and television roles throughout the 1970s. Cameron was reportedly considered for the Love Story role that went to Ali MacGraw. She acted in the 1970s films B.S. I Love You and the black comedy Pretty Maids All in a Row.

Her television performances also included roles in The Bold Ones: The New Doctors, Columbo, and several episodes of Marcus Welby, MD. She also had a prolific career in commercials and claimed at one time to have held the record for having done the most commercials in the Guinness Book of World Records.

The Secrets of Isis

In 1975, Cameron was cast as the title character in the Saturday morning children's series Isis. In the series, Cameron portrayed a young high-school science teacher named Andrea Thomas who discovers an enchanted amulet while in Egypt. The amulet, which originally belonged to the ancient Egyptian pharaoh Queen Hatshepsut and also intended for Hatshepsut's (female) descendants (including Thomas herself), bestows the supposed powers of the goddess Isis on her when she invokes them by uttering the phrase, "O mighty Isis!" These powers include super-human strength and speed ("the speed of gazelles"), the ability to fly (or to "soar as the falcon soars"), and telekinesis ("command [of] the elements of sky and Earth"), all of which she uses to fight crime.

Isis ran from September 6, 1975, to September 3, 1977. Twenty-two episodes were produced, and Isis also appeared in three episodes of the related Saturday morning super-hero drama Shazam!. Despite the show's popularity, it was not renewed for a third season. When the show went into syndication in 1978, it was renamed The Secrets of Isis. The character of Isis later appeared in a cartoon called Tarzan and the Super 7, in segments dealing with a super-team called "The Freedom Force," but with Isis's voice provided by Diane Pershing.

Later career
After her role as Isis, Cameron played television roles in McMillan & Wife and The Amazing Spider-Man. She also was host of the Navy Network, a TV series produced by the United States Navy about aspects of naval life, and directed a commercial for the Naval Academy titled Razor Sharp.

In the late 1970s, Cameron was cited in the Guinness Book of World Records as having appeared in more TV commercials than anyone else, 105. Merv Griffin once estimated that her commercials, strung together, would run for 150 hours. According to TV Guide, advertisers "have spent more than $100 million using JoAnna as the beauteous centerpiece of their commercials for cosmetics, shampoo, wine, beer, panty hose and breath freshener, among other things."

Cameron's last-known role was in the 1980 TV movie Swan Song.

Following her acting career, Cameron worked in the home healthcare industry as a nurse for 10 years, and followed that with a career in marketing for several hotels.

Death 
It was announced by Joanna Pang Atkins, who played Cindy Lee on The Secrets of Isis, that Cameron died in Oahu, Hawaii, due to complications from a stroke on October 15, 2021.

Filmography

References

External links

1948 births
2021 deaths
Female models from Colorado
American film actresses
American television actresses
Actresses from Colorado
People from Greeley, Colorado
People from Weld County, Colorado
20th-century American actresses
21st-century American women